Dignagore Union is a union parishad situated at Shailkupa Upazila,  in Jhenaidah District, Khulna Division of Bangladesh. There are 15 villages and 14 Mouzas in the union.

References

External links
 

Unions of Khulna Division
Unions of Shailkupa Upazila
Unions of Jhenaidah District